Vance Odell Lovelace (born August 9, 1963) is a former Major League Baseball pitcher from 1988 to 1990 for the California Angels and Seattle Mariners. Lovelace was a southpaw power pitcher from Tampa's Hillsborough High School, the same school where Dwight Gooden and Gary Sheffield played.

Career
Lovelace appeared in nine games during his career, all in relief, and finished with a 0–0 career record, and a 5.79 ERA over just 4.2 total innings pitched from 1988 to 1990. Lovelace spent 1981 to 1987, and 1991 to 1994 in Minor League Baseball for the Chicago Cubs, Los Angeles Dodgers, California Angels, Seattle Mariners, Detroit Tigers, Atlanta Braves, and Texas Rangers. organizations, including a brief stint in the Chinese Professional Baseball League for the Brother Elephants in 1993. Lovelace also appeared for the Brother Elephants during the 1998 season. In 1997 and 1998, Lovelace played in the Northeast League for the Catskill Cougars and New Jersey Jackals.

He joined the Dodgers as vice-president of Player Personnel in 2009 and his position was changed to Special Advisor to the President in 2014, which he held through 2016.

References

External links

Los Angeles Dodgers executive''

1963 births
Living people
American expatriate baseball players in Canada
Baseball players from Tampa, Florida
California Angels players
Calgary Cannons players
Catskill Cougars players
Edmonton Trappers players
Greenville Braves players
Gulf Coast Cubs players
London Tigers players
Los Angeles Dodgers executives
Los Angeles Dodgers scouts
Major League Baseball pitchers
Midland Angels players
New Jersey Jackals players
Oklahoma City 89ers players
Palm Springs Angels players
Quad Cities Cubs players
Richmond Braves players
San Antonio Dodgers players
Seattle Mariners players
Toledo Mud Hens players
Vero Beach Dodgers players
People convicted of battery
African-American baseball players